Promise Tour is the second concert tour by British band Sade that lasted for eight months. Visiting the United States, Europe, Japan, and Australia the tour supported the band's second studio album, Promise. During the tour, rumours of strange behaviour began to circulate about the lead singer Adu. The last three dates of the tour were cancelled due to the critical illness of a band member's mother.

Set list
This set list is representative of the show on February 22, 1986 in Forest, Belgium. It does not represent all shows during the tour.
"Why Can't We Live Together"
"Cherry Pie"
"Smooth Operator"
"Red Eye"
"War of the Hearts"
"Keep Hanging On"
"Fear"
"Your Love Is King"
"Mr. Wrong"
"Never as Good as the First Time"
"Maureen"
"Sally"
"Snake Bite"
"Is It a Crime?"
"The Sweetest Taboo"
"Jezebel"

References

Sade (band) concert tours
1986 concert tours